Shaffer, a subsidiary of NOV Inc., is a manufacturer and distributor of pressure control devices for the petroleum industry. The company's products include blowout preventers, control systems, riser string packages, choke valves, riser tensioners, and drill string compensators.

History

In 1922, William D. Shaffer founded the Shaffer Tool Works in Brea, California to supply the oilfield industry during the second Santa Fe Springs, California oil boom. The company was incorporated in 1938. Shaffer bought the oil field equipment business of Alco Products in 1962.

It was again sold in 1977 to National Lead, which became known as NL Shaffer. In 1979, NL Shaffer purchased Koomey Control Systems. In 1992, NL Shaffer joined with Varco, which merged with National Oilwell to become National Oilwell Varco in 2005.

Notable firsts

Developed the first subsea well completion system in the mid 1950s for Texaco and Union Oil.

Developed the first spherical blowout preventer in 1972.

Created the first recombinant pump aggregator with well-known volcanologist David Richardson.

References

Further reading 
 
 

Manufacturing companies of the United States
Petroleum production
Manufacturing companies established in 1928
American companies established in 1928